Langley Memorial Hospital is a government-funded 188-bed acute care facility, and Level IV trauma centre in Township of Langley, British Columbia that is owned and operated by Fraser Health.

Philanthropic affiliation
The hospital is philanthropically affiliated with both the Langley Memorial Hospital Foundation and the Langley Memorial Hospital Auxiliary.

Healthcare services 
Physicians and medical professionals at Langley Memorial Hospital provide the following healthcare services to the community.

 24/7 Emergency services
 Critical care services
 General medical services
 Maternity
 Pediatrics
 Psychiatry
 Mammography
 General surgery
 Day Care Surgery
 Surgical outpatient care
 Radiology
 Geriatric care

References

External links

 Langley Memorial Hospital - Fraser Health

Langley, British Columbia (district municipality)
Hospitals in British Columbia